X is a science fiction space trading and combat simulator series created by German developer Egosoft. The series is set in the X-Universe where several races populate a number of worlds connected by jumpgates. The games feature free roaming gameplay with trading, combat, empire building, and missions; leading to the series' phrase: "Trade, Fight, Build, Think". The series, which was launched in 1999 on the Windows platform, consists of five base games: X: Beyond the Frontier, X2: The Threat, X3: Reunion, X Rebirth, and X4: Foundations.  X Rebirth introduced a new rendering engine as well as a new plot, one which X4: Foundations now extends the storyline beyond ten years after the events in X Rebirth.

Story 
The fiction behind the X series is provided in the games themselves and in four novels by series fictional writer Helge Kautz: Farnham's Legend, Nopileos, Yoshiko and Hüter der Tore ("Keeper of the Gates"). Farnham's Legend is available in English.

Over the course of the 21st century, mankind experimented with wormhole technology and successfully built jumpgates in space between Earth and Mars paving the way for the colonization of the solar system and interstellar transport. A jumpgate was shuttled to Alpha Centauri in an attempt to claim a foothold in interstellar space. Even before the gate left the solar system, scientists discovered that many objects classified as black holes showed the characteristics of artificial wormholes. There were alien jumpgates which the human-constructed gates could connect to. The Terrans had discovered the X Universe, a seemingly uninhabited collection of star systems connected by a vast network of large, bi-directional jump gates.

Puzzled by the lack of intelligent life within this network, but driven by their curiosity and the urge to colonise the new worlds, the Terrans ventured into the X Universe, intent on expanding their territory. Terraforming machines were created and dispatched to terraform planets into habitable worlds. The Terraformers were self-replicating spacecraft, governed by a simple artificial intelligence. During a software update several flaws were introduced into the Terraformer fleet and distributed between them, causing a radical change in behaviour. The Terraformers replicated and attempted to re-terraform colonised planets, causing the planets to lose their ability to support human life. In an attempt to halt the Terraformers, the Terrans became embroiled in a war with their creations. No colony was able to defend against the attacks, and mankind was pushed back to the Sol System where the Terraformers launched an attempt to destroy all life forms and terraform all of the inner planets.

In a daring attempt to save the solar system, a group of ships, led by Nathan R. Gunne, lured the Terraformers through the gate into the X Universe. The Earth gate was then destroyed, trapping the Terraformers in the X-Universe and cutting Earth off from the rest of the network.

The X-series is set more than 750 years after these events. A single Terraformer craft appears in the solar system using an apparently experimental gateless jumpdrive. The Terrans reverse engineer the device. In its maiden flight, the X-Shuttle, piloted by test pilot Kyle Brennan, is accidentally transported into the X Universe. Unlike before, this part of the network is inhabited by several space faring alien races and the descendants of Nathan R. Gunne's fleet. The Terraformers are attempting to get to Earth and Kyle must stop them.

The X universe 
The fictional X-Universe is a collection of sectors connected by two-way jumpgates. The total number of sectors is unknown, but the number of "discovered" sectors has increased in each game; from 54, in X: Beyond the Frontier, to over 200 in X³: Terran Conflict, including the re-discovered Sol system.

Sectors typically orbit planets, within a star system. Most contain game resources such as asteroids of silicon or ore, and many contain inhabitable planets. Each sector contains up to four jumpgates, in a North, East, South, West pattern. Each sector is named by the organisation that controls it.

Notable sectors include: Argon Federation home-sector, "Argon Prime"; Boron Kingdom home-sector "Kingdom End", Teladi Company headquarters "Seizewell"; Split Dynasty home-sector "Family Pride"; and Paranid Empire home world "Paranid Prime". The Xenon home-sector has never been discovered.

Most sectors are controlled by one X-Universe race, and will contain only stations economically indigenous to that race. For example, Atreus Clouds is a Boron sector, containing only Boron stations. Here the player can buy special Boron weaponry and equipment that is unavailable from other races. Boron stations sell Boron trade products, and they often want to buy the trade products of other races. Such products can be imported, exported and traded by the player for profit. This compels the player to explore the sectors of the different races to discover the most useful upgrades, and most profitable trade routes.

For convenience, most stations and facilities are located in the space between the jumpgates, known as the "ecliptic plane". However, each sector is unbounded, and the player may travel in any direction almost indefinitely. Beyond the main area of a sector is mostly empty void, though official X material, as well as in-game messages and missions hint at lost ships, secret stations, and other treasures and dangers lurking in remote areas.

In games up to and including X²: The Threat, X-Universe sectors are of uniform size, and gates are usually centre-North, South, East and West of the ecliptic plane. In X³: Reunion sectors became much more varied. The distances between gates vary between 50 km in some sectors to over 200 km in others. The exact position of the gates is unpredictable and gates are generally harder to find.

It is not possible to fly to planets in game. Planet-based activity is only possible in plot-related events of X²: The Threat and X³: Reunion. It is only possible to fly into planet atmospheres, though this will result in the ship's destruction.

It is possible that all sectors in the X-Universe are in the Milky Way. With gate technology, some sectors which are distant in the gate system could be cosmically close together. Conversely, sectors near to each other in the jumpgate grid could be physically far apart. Due to the ease of use of the jumpgate system, most races have not progressed far enough in more conventional interstellar science to be sure.

Featured races 
The X-Universe features several sentient species, some of which are yet to be seen in the games, themselves:

 Boron: A squidlike alien race that reveres their queen and love peace.
 Human: Divided into three factions:
 Argon: Humans who are descended from the remains of the fleet that lured the Terraformers through the gateway that saved Earth in the terraformer wars. The Argon government decided centuries ago that the pain of separation with Earth was best dealt with by changing the official version of history so that humans in the X-Universe believed they evolved in their current location.
 Goner: Argons who believe the legend of Earth and Nathan R. Gunne (who led the fleet that saved Earth), despite both being officially just a myth.
 Terran: Humans who were born in the Sol system.
 Khaak: A buglike alien race that started war with the Argon in X²: The Threat. They decimated the sector now known as "President's End".
 Paranid: A three-eyed alien race that hail to their Xaar emperor and have a strict religion.
 Split: A tribal alien race that fight within themselves as much as they fight their enemies.
 Teladi: A reptilian alien race that worship trade and profits.
 Xenon: A self-replicating artificial intelligence evolved from the terraformers created by the Terrans in an effort to colonise worlds. Now hostile to all life, they destroy anything organic.

The X series 
The series, which was launched in 1999 on the Windows platform, consists of five base games: X: Beyond the Frontier, X2: The Threat, X3: Reunion, X Rebirth and X4: Foundations. The series games are expanded by sequels that both add features and extend the plot. A plot can be undertaken in all games except X-Tension where the player takes part in missions to unfold events.

Novel 
Farnham's Legend is a science fiction novel set in the X series. It was written in German by Helge T. Kautz, and has been translated into English by Steve Miller and Andreas Fuchs. The novel was published by Egosoft in 2005.

Each chapter tells the story from one character's viewpoint. The main characters in this book are:
 Capt. Kyle William Brennan - the human test pilot of the X-perimental space shuttle and the playable character in X: Beyond the Frontier.
 Major Elena Kho -  another human, longtime friend of Brennan from Earth, sent to rescue Brennan by the USC.
 Cho - a humanoid Split, he is the special envoy of the patriarch of Chin.
 Nopileos - a young reptilian Teladi, she encounters Elena on her mission to find Kyle.

References 

 
Video game franchises
Video game franchises introduced in 1999